Josh is a 2000 Indian Hindi-language romantic action film directed and co-written by Mansoor Khan. The film stars Shah Rukh Khan, Aishwarya Rai Bachchan, Chandrachur Singh and Sharad Kapoor. The film, which is primarily in Hindi with occasional Konkani,  was set and filmed in Goa. The film has some plot points inspired by the 1961 musical West Side Story. The film is set in the year 1980, amidst the backdrop of real estate deals and communal violence in Goa.

Josh released on 9 June 2000, and emerged as a commercial success at the box office, grossing  worldwide. It received mixed reviews from critics upon release, with praise for its soundtrack and cast performances, but criticism for its story and screenplay. 

At the 46th Filmfare Awards, Josh received 5 nominations, including Best Film and Best Director (Mansoor).

Plot
In the town of Vasco in Goa, there exist two rival street gangs -  the Bichhoos (Scorpions), who are local Hindu's, and the Eagles, who are immigrant Christians. The leader of the Bichhoos is Prakash Sharma (Sharad Kapoor), while the Eagles are led by Max Dias (Shah Rukh Khan).
Prakash is a local enforcer, who uses his gang to engage in underhanded activities within the Vasco real estate market. Max, along with his educated twin sister Shirley (Aishwarya Rai Bachchan), are orphans who belong to a rowdy motorcycle crew, together with the other members of the Eagles.
The gangs are sworn enemies and have demarcated the town in order to avoid altercations. They are usually stopped from fights by Father Jacob or the town Police Inspector (Sharat Saxena).

Prakash's brother Rahul (Chandrachur Singh) is a well-educated Masterchef working in Mumbai. He comes to visit Vasco after two years, intending to take his family back to Mumbai with him. Rahul decides to tour Vasco and rediscovers his love for the city. While in the territory of the Eagle Gang, he spots Shirley and becomes fascinated by her heavenly beauty and elegance at first sight. He eventually develops a deep attraction for Shirley and decides to settle in Vasco and open a pastry shop. Meanwhile, he unknowingly becomes part of the Eagle - Bichchoo rivalry and gets closer to Shirley. However, Max and the Eagles, not approving of Rahul having moved in, destroy the shop and put Rahul in severe debt to the landlord who permitted him to use his shop for his business.

Prakash, in desperate need of money, plans to take over the village ground. The ground historically belonged to Alberto Vasco, the landlord of the entire village and the man after whom the town is named. Rahul finds out that the ground was passed from Alberto to a woman named Mary Anne Louise. Unaware of his brother's schemes, Rahul visits the address listed for Mr. Vasco, and it is revealed that Mary was a renter in the Rose villa at 13, Churchill Road which belonged to Lady D'Costa (Nadira), twenty-two years ago. Rahul learns from Mrs. D'costa that Mary is Max and Shirley's mother and the twins are the illegitimate children of Alberto Vasco, born in 1958.

Having developed a close relationship with Shirley, Rahul plans to reveal this information to her in the form of a letter, however, it falls into the hands of Prakash. Prakash plots to get Rahul married to Shirley, and in the meantime murder Max, in order to receive Alberto Vasco's valuable land worth Rs. 20 lakhs. When he tries to execute his plan, and kill Max, a bloody fight breaks out between the two, and Max accidentally shoots Prakash while defending himself. Max is arrested by the police, and his trial puts a rift between Shirley and Rahul, as he believes Prakash went to Max just to ask Shirley for him and Max murdered him for no real reason. Before Max receives his verdict, Rahul learns the truth and hence, defends Max in court. Max is released and asks Rahul for forgiveness and his hand in marriage with Shirley, thereby uniting the Eagles and Bichhoos with each other.

The film ends on a happy note, with scenes from Rahul and Shirley's wedding during the epilogue.

Cast
Shah Rukh Khan as Max Dias
Aishwarya Rai Bachchan as Shirley Dias, Max's sister.
Chandrachur Singh as Rahul Sharma
Sharad Kapoor as Prakash Sharma, Rahul's brother.
Priya Gill as Rosanne (special appearance)
Aastha Gill as Holly
Aanjjan Srivastav as Mr.Mascarenhas
Vivek Vaswani as Savio
Ruhshad Nariman Daruwalla
Sharat Saxena as Police Inspector
Puneet Vashisht as Michael
Sushant Singh as Ghotya
Nadira as Lady D'Costa
Suhas Joshi as Rahul's mom
Ali Asgar as Deven
Rajesh Khera as Matwyn
Manav Gohil as Ganpat
Shraddha Nigam as Prakash's girlfriend
Saandesh B.Nayak as Chandu
Jaspal Sandhu as D'Mello
Maqbool Khan as Vasant

Production 
Director Mansoor Khan was initially considering Salman Khan for the role of Max Dias, but things didn't work out as he was dating the actress, and he signed on Shah Rukh Khan. Mansoor Khan has revealed he was keen on bringing Shah Rukh Khan and Aamir Khan together for his film Josh, but the latter rejected the film. Aamir Khan was apparently offered the role of Rahul Sharma. "Aamir Khan wanted to change the image and he no longer wanted to play the lover boy or romantic hero Rahul Sharma," Mansoor Khan told reporters. Mansoor also offered the role of Shirley to Kajol, who declined.

Actor Puneet Vashist, who played the role of Michael in the film, has since claimed that his screentime, as well as that of fellow co-actors Aishwarya Rai, Sharad Kapoor & Chandrachur Singh, was reduced in the editing room, with Vashist claiming that almost fifty per cent of his scenes were cut out. Filming began in March 1999.

Music
A. R. Rahman was signed in as the music composer first, but he opted out, due to scheduling conflicts with other films. After Rahman opted out, Mansoor Khan roped in Anu Malik to complete the music fast, and release the film on time. According to the Indian trade website Box Office India,. The song "Hai Mera Dil" is based on "Sealed with a Kiss" written by Peter Udell and Gary Geld, and "Djobi Djoba" performed by Gipsy Kings.

Reception

Box office
It is the 6th-highest-grossing Bollywood film of 2000 worldwide.

In India, the film opened on Friday, 9 June 2000, across 300 screens, and earned  nett on its opening day. It grossed  nett in its opening weekend, and had a first week of  nett. The film earned a total of  nett, and was declared "Average" by Box Office India. It is the 5th-highest-grossing film of 2000 in India.

Among overseas territories, Josh had an opening weekend of $575,000 (2.55 crore) and went on to gross $800,000 (3.56 crore) in its first week. The film earned a total of $1.127 million (5.01 crore) at the end of its theatrical run. Overseas, It is the 9th-highest-grossing film of 2000.

Critical reception
The film received mixed reviews from critics. Planet Bollywood gave the film 7.5/10 and wrote, "Mansoor [Khan] succeeds as a director in keeping the movie fast and interesting, though it is the characters who come out much stronger than the film". Taran Adarsh from Bollywood Hungama noted "On the whole, Josh is a well-made film with great performances and a hit musical score. But the Goan ambience will restrict its prospects in some states due to lack of identification. Also, an average second half and a weak climax are major limitations".

Awards 

 46th Filmfare Awards:

Nominated

 Best Film – Ratan Jain
 Best Director – Mansoor Khan
 Best Villain – Sharad Kapoor 
 Best Music Director – Anu Malik
 Best Female Playback Singer – Alka Yagnik for "Haaye Mera Dil"
2nd IIFA Awards:

Won

 Best Art Direction – Nitin Chandrakant Desai

Nominated

 Best Director – Mansoor Khan
 Best Supporting Actor – Chandrachur Singh
 Best Villain – Sharad Kapoor
 Best Music Director – Anu Malik
 Best Story – Mansoor Khan

References

External links
 
 
 

2000s romantic action films
2000 action drama films
2000s Hindi-language films
2000 films
Films shot in Goa
Films scored by Anu Malik
Films set in Goa
Indian romantic action films
Indian action drama films